Limlu (also Romanized as Līmlū; also known as Līmūlū) is a village in the Qeshlaq-e Jonubi Rural District, Qeshlaq Dasht District, Bileh Savar County, Ardabil Province, Iran. In the 2006 census, its population was counted as 125, spread across 26 families.

References 

Towns and villages in Bileh Savar County